Kaimar Karu (born 30 June 1980) is an Estonian politician. He served as Minister of Foreign Trade and Information Technology in the second cabinet of Jüri Ratas from 2 November 2019 to 17 April 2020. He represented the Conservative People's Party of Estonia (EKRE) as an independent politician.

On 17 April 2020, he announced on social media that the chairman of the Conservative People's Party Mart Helme recalled him from the government. Helme accused Karu for not respecting party values, including their anti immigration views. Karu had been under strain for not supporting changes made to the Aliens Act. Raul Siem was appointed as his replacement.

References 

Living people
1980 births
Place of birth missing (living people)
Government ministers of Estonia
21st-century Estonian politicians
University of Tartu alumni